was a town located in Yamamoto District, Akita Prefecture, Japan.

As of 2003, the town had an estimated population of 4,494 and a density of 39.90 persons per km². The total area was 112.62 km².

On March 27, 2006, Hachimori, along with the village of Minehama (also from Yamamoto District), was merged to create the town of Happō.

External links
Hachimori official website in Japanese
Wayback machine

Dissolved municipalities of Akita Prefecture
Happō, Akita